String Quartet No. 1 in C major, Op. 37, is a composition for string quartet by Karol Szymanowski. It was the first of the two string quartets composed by Szymanowski. The work is from 1917 during his middle period.  It is notable for its "polytonal" third movement, which contains four key signatures in its written four parts: the first violin with 3 sharps, the second violin with 6 sharps, the viola with 3 flats, and the cello with no flats or sharps.

Dedicated to the French musicologist Henry Prunières, the work won the first prize in the Polish Ministry of Religious Denominations and Public Enlightenment's chamber music competition. Its first public performance was in Warsaw on 7 March 1924 played by the Warsaw Philharmonic Quartet. Szymanowski planned on including a fourth movement, a fugal finale, but the idea ultimately got scrapped. A performance usually lasts 17-18 minutes.

Recordings
String quartets who have recorded the piece include:
Varsovia Quartet. Olympia (1989) (may be the same as an earlier 1983 recording by the same, see .)
Warsaw String Quartet. Da Camera Magna (coissue? with Pavane) (1982)
Wilanow String Quartet.  Veriton (1979); Polskie Nagrania Edition (1994)
Goldner String Quartet. Naxos (2000)
Meccore String Quartet. Polskie Nagrania/Warner Music Poland (2015)

See also
 List of polytonal pieces

References

Stowell, Robin (2003).  The Cambridge Companion to the String Quartet. Cambridge University Press
Thomas,  Adrian  (2005). Polish Music since Szymanowski. Cambridge University Press.

External links
 

Compositions by Karol Szymanowski
1917 compositions
Szymanowski, Karol
Compositions in C major